RMCC may refer to:
Royal Military College of Canada
Rich Mountain Community College, Mena, Arkansas, United States
Russell Midcap Index (ticker symbol: ^RMCC)

See also
QBE Shootout, team golf event on the PGA tour, founded as the RMCC Invitational in 1989
Resident magistrate's court case (abbreviated RMCC in legal citations)